Lespedeza virginica, known as slender bush clover or slender lespedeza, is a species of flowering plant native to much of the United States, as well as Ontario, Canada. It is a member of the bean family, Fabaceae.

Description
Lespedeza virginica is an herbaceous, perennial legume. It can grow to be up to 2.5 feet tall. Slender bush clover has trifoliate compound leaves and slender primary petioles, with the stem covered in small white hairs. Its alternate leaves are dark green, though sometimes appear pale. The flowers are pink in color and have a broad upper petal with two side petals. Flowers produced are either cleistogamous or chasmogamous. Slender bush clover flowers from July to September and sets seed from September to October. L. virginica grows well in environments with full to partial sun and can grow successfully in rocky or sandy soils. It produces a taproot to assist in establishment.

Distribution and habitat
Lespedeza virginica is found from Maine south to Florida, west to Texas and north to Michigan as well as in Eastern Canada. L. virginica prefers drier habitats, but can be found in prairies, rocky and sandy forests, savannas and environments with high drainage such as roadsides.

Ecology
Lespedeza virginica is eaten by a wide variety of wildlife. It is a large part of the bobwhite quail's diet as well as deer and other ground birds. The seeds are eaten as well as the leaves. Nectar and pollen are eaten by various long-tongued insects such as butterflies and bees.

Conservation
Lespedeza virginica is listed as threatened in Wisconsin and endangered in New Hampshire  and Ontario.

References

virginica
Flora of the United States
Flora of Eastern Canada
Taxa named by Carl Linnaeus
Plants described in 1753